"In the Party" is a song by American rapper Flo Milli. It was released on October 28, 2019, by '94 Sounds and RCA Records. The track is one of her breakthrough hits and the second single from her debut mixtape, Ho, Why Is You Here? (2020).

Background
Along with Flo Milli's previous hit, "Beef FloMix", the song helped propel her to fame through popular use on video-sharing app TikTok. Upon its release, "In the Party" amassed several millions of streams on Spotify as well.

Reception
Micah Peters of The Ringer and Stephen Kearse of Pitchfork both praised the song's opening line, "Dicks up when I step up in the party".

Certifications

References

2019 singles
2019 songs
Flo Milli songs